Southwark Theatre, was a theatre in Philadelphia, founded in 1766.  It played a significant part in the Culture of Philadelphia as well as the United States, being the first permanent theatre in Philadelphia and the first permanent theatre in the United States, one year prior to John Street Theatre in New York.

History
The Southwark Theatre was founded on the South Street outside of the city borders in the south of Philadelphia.  It was founded by the Old American Company, who regularly used the building during their tours to the city for about thirty years onward.

Theatre had been performed in Philadelphia already in 1749, in a temporary building known as the Plumstead's warehouse, but the Southwark Theatre was the first permanent theatre building in the city.  It remained the only theatre in the city until it the Chestnut Street Theatre was founded in 1794, which soon replaced it as the city's main venue.

References

 Seilhamer, George Overcash,  History of the American theatre
 Dunlap, William, A history of the American theatre

18th century in Philadelphia
Former theatres in the United States
1766 establishments in the Thirteen Colonies
Theatres completed in 1766